Tyrese Darnell Gibson (born December 30, 1978) is an American actor and singer. He released his self-titled debut album in 1998, which featured the single "Sweet Lady", peaking at number twelve on the U.S. Billboard Hot 100. His second and third albums, 2000 Watts and I Wanna Go There, were released in 2001 and 2002, respectively. The latter contained the lead single "How You Gonna Act Like That", which became Gibson's highest-charting single, reaching number seven on the Billboard Hot 100. His fourth album, Alter Ego, explored hip hop, while he was nominated for the Grammy Award for Best R&B Album for his fifth album, Open Invitation (2011). Gibson's sixth album, Black Rose (2015), debuted at number one on the U.S. Billboard 200, becoming his highest-charting album. He has sold over 4 million records in the United States.

Gibson had his first starring role in John Singleton's coming-of-age hood film Baby Boy (2001), and then began appearing as Roman Pearce in the Fast & Furious franchise. Gibson reunited with Singleton for the action film Four Brothers (2005) and plays Robert Epps in the Transformers franchise. He appeared in the comedy film Ride Along 2 (2016) and appeared in the superhero film Morbius (2022).

Early life
Gibson was born and raised in Watts, Los Angeles, California. His mother, Priscilla Murray Gibson ( Durham), raised him and his three older siblings as a single parent after his father, Tyrone Gibson, left.

Music career

Beginnings 
Gibson's career began when he auditioned for a Coca-Cola commercial at the suggestion of his high school music teacher. An appearance in a 1994 Coca-Cola advertisement, singing the phrase "Always Coca-Cola", led to bigger fame. It also led him to other appearances, such as for Guess and Tommy Hilfiger.

1998–1999: Tyrese 

Gibson was signed as an artist to RCA Records in early 1998. Afterwards, he released his debut single "Nobody Else". It quickly rose on the Billboard Hot 100 chart, peaking at No. 36. On September 29, 1998, he released his self-titled album Tyrese at the age of 19. It debuted on the Billboard charts at No. 17. In late 1998, Gibson became the new host of the weekday music video show MTV Jams on MTV and a host and VJ for the channel. Afterwards, he released the second single from the album "Lately". It made it to No. 56 on the Billboard charts. Then, the album's third single and highest-charting single "Sweet Lady" became the album's biggest hit, reaching No. 9 on the R&B charts. The single earned Gibson a Grammy nomination for Best R&B Male Vocal Performance. The album eventually went on to be certified Platinum. Gibson, along with singers Ginuwine, RL of Next, and Case, were featured on the soundtrack of The Best Man on the single "The Best Man I Can Be".

2000–2001: 2000 Watts 

On May 22, 2001, Gibson released his second studio album 2000 Watts. The first single off the album was "I Like Them Girls", which reached No. 15 on the Billboard Hot R&B/Hip-Hop Songs chart. The album went on to be certified Gold, selling over 500,000 copies. The third single off the album, "Just a Baby Boy", with Snoop Dogg and Mr. Tan, was featured on the soundtrack to the film Baby Boy, Gibson's first major acting role.

2002–2004: I Wanna Go There 

After RCA Records was disbanded, Gibson went on to sign to J Records. There he released his third studio album I Wanna Go There on December 10, 2002. His first single from the album and arguably his most successful single to date "How You Gonna Act Like That" debuted on the Hot R&B/Hip-Hop Songs chart at No. 7.

2005–2010: Alter Ego and hiatus 

On December 12, 2006, Gibson released his fourth studio album, Alter Ego, his first double-disc album. It was also the first album in which he showcased his rapping persona. The first single off the album was "One" debuting on the Hot R&B/Hip-Hop Songs chart at No. 26. The album itself is considered Gibson's lowest selling album to date. In 2007, Gibson, Ginuwine, and Tank founded TGT.

2011–2012: Open Invitation 

After taking time from music to focus on his family and acting career, Gibson returned to music in 2011, when he signed himself to EMI and released his fifth studio album Open Invitation on November 1. The album debuted on the US Billboard 200 albums chart at No. 9, sold 130,000 copies in its first week and has gone on to sell over 400,000 copies. It was preceded by the lead single "Stay" and peaked on the US Hot R&B/Hip-Hop Songs chart at No. 11. The second single "Too Easy" featured fellow actor, friend and rapper Ludacris. It peaked on the US Hot R&B/Hip-Hop Songs chart at No. 38. The third single "Nothing On You" peaked on the US Hot R&B/Hip-Hop Songs chart at No. 61. In 2013, the album earned Gibson his third Grammy nomination at the 2013 Grammy Awards for Best R&B Album.

2013–2017: TGT and Black Rose 
In early 2013, it was announced and confirmed after much speculation that Gibson, Ginuwine, and Tank would be releasing their debut collaboration album, to be distributed by Atlantic Records. In 2014, Gibson released the album Black Rose. A double album set was released in 2015. On July 10, 2015, Black Rose was released and debuted at No. 1 on the Billboard 200, with first-week sales of 77,000 copies, making it Gibson's first number one album of his career.

2017–present: Identity Theft 
In October 2017, Gibson worked on a project titled Identity Theft, returning to his alter-ego Black Ty. The album focuses more on his hip-hop roots, with Gibson predicting that it will "change hip-hop."

When Gibson competed on season five of The Masked Singer, interim host Niecy Nash introduced his character as "Porcupine," only for Gibson to tell her that his character preferred to be called "Robopine."

Acting career
Gibson has a recurring role in two of the highest-grossing film series: Fast & Furious and Transformers. His first role was in John Singleton's Baby Boy in 2001.

Fast & Furious

Gibson plays Roman Pearce in the Fast & Furious film series. He first played Pearce alongside his best friend, the late Paul Walker, in 2003's 2 Fast 2 Furious, his second collaboration with Singleton. He returned as Roman Pearce in Fast Five (2011), Fast & Furious 6 (2013), Furious 7 (2015), The Fate of the Furious (2017), and F9 (2021).

Transformers

Gibson portrays Sergeant Robert Epps in the Transformers film series. In 2007, with the cast of Josh Duhamel, John Turturro, Megan Fox, Anthony Anderson and Jon Voight, with star Shia LaBeouf, Transformers went on to make nearly $710 million worldwide. It was directed and co-produced by Michael Bay. Steven Spielberg served as the executive producer. Gibson reprised his role in the sequels Transformers: Revenge of the Fallen (2009) and Transformers: Dark of the Moon (2011). Gibson was supposed to return as Epps in Transformers: The Last Knight (2017), but was unable to appear due to scheduling conflicts with The Fate of the Furious.

Other films
In 2005, Singleton and Gibson collaborated for the third time when Gibson co-starred in the action-crime drama Four Brothers alongside Mark Wahlberg.

Gibson went on to star in the action-drama Waist Deep with Meagan Good.

In 2008, he co-starred opposite Jason Statham in Death Race.

In March 2019, Gibson joined Jared Leto in Sony's Spider-Man spinoff Morbius.

Writing
In 2009, Gibson co-created a three-issue comic book titled Tyrese Gibson's MAYHEM! after being inspired from his visit to Comic Con.

On May 8, 2012, Gibson released his first book, titled How to Get Out of Your Own Way. It went on to be a New York Times bestseller. On February 5, 2013, Gibson co-authored his second book along with close personal friend Rev. Run titled Manology: Secrets of Your Man's Mind Revealed, which also went on to be a New York Times best seller.

Personal life
Gibson was married to Norma Mitchell from 2007 to 2009, and the couple had one child, a daughter, born in 2007. 

In 2017, Tyrese purchased a $4 million home in Atlanta, Georgia. He married Samantha Lee on February 14, 2017. Their daughter was born on October 1, 2018. In December 2020, Gibson and Lee announced they were divorcing.

Discography

Solo albums
 Tyrese (1998)
 2000 Watts (2001)
 I Wanna Go There (2002)
 Alter Ego (2006)
 Open Invitation (2011)
 Black Rose (2015)
 Beautiful Pain (2023)

Collaborative albums
 Three Kings  (2013)

Filmography

Film

Television

Music videos

Theme park ride

Awards and nominations
American Music Awards

|-
| 2000
| Tyrese Gibson
| Favorite New R&B/Soul Artist
| 
|}

Black Movie Awards

|-
| 2006
| Waist Deep
| Outstanding Performance by an Actor in a Leading Role
| 
|}

Black Reel Awards

|-
| rowspan="2" | 2002
| "Just a Baby Boy" (with Mr. Tan and Snoop Dogg)
| Best Song
| 
|-
| Baby Boy
| Best Actor
| 
|-
| 2006
| Four Brothers
| Best Ensemble
| 
|}

Grammy Awards

|-
| 2000
| "Sweet Lady"
| rowspan="2"  | Best R&B Male Vocal Performance
| 
|-
| 2004
| "How U Gonna Act Like That"
| 
|-
| 2013
| Open Invitation
| rowspan="2"  | Best R&B Album
| 
|-
| 2014
| Three Kings with Ginuwine and Tank as TGT
| 
|-
| rowspan="2" | 2016
| rowspan="2" | "Shame"
| Best Traditional R&B Performance
| 
|-
| Best R&B Song
| 
|}

NAACP Image Awards

|-
| 2002
| 2000 Watts
| Outstanding Hip-Hop Artist
| 
|-
| 2002
| Baby Boy
| Outstanding Actor in a Motion Picture
| 
|-
| 2002
| The Tonight Show with Jay Leno
| Outstanding Performance in a Variety Show
| 
|-
| 2012
| Trumpet Awards
| Pinnacle Award
| 
|}

Locarno International Film Festival

|-
| 2001
| Baby Boy for 'its innovative concept and ensemble acting'
| Special Mention Award
|}

Soul Train Music Awards

|-
| 2013
| "TGT" with Ginuwine and Tank
| New Artist of the Year
| 
|-
| 2012
| "Stay"
| Song of the Year
| 
|}

References

External links

 
 

1978 births
Living people
20th-century African-American male singers
20th-century American male actors
21st-century American male actors
21st-century African-American male singers
21st-century American rappers
African-American Christians
African-American male actors
African-American male models
African-American male rappers
African-American models
American contemporary R&B singers
American hip hop singers
African-American male singer-songwriters
American male film actors
American male models
American male pop singers
American soul singers
American male television actors
American male voice actors
Florida A&M University alumni
J Records artists
Male actors from California
Male actors from Los Angeles
Male models from California
Models from Los Angeles
People from Watts, Los Angeles
Rappers from California
Rappers from Los Angeles
RCA Records artists
Singers from Los Angeles
Singer-songwriters from California
TGT (group) members
VJs (media personalities)